Two and Two Make Six, also known as A Change of Heart and The Girl Swappers, is a 1962 black and white British romantic comedy film directed by Freddie Francis and starring George Chakiris and Janette Scott.

Unusually, the two women are the main pursuers in the storyline, and the men are each slow to respond.

Plot
American serviceman Larry is serving in England when he goes absent without leave. After accidentally knocking out a sergeant sent to arrest him he goes on the run with a girl, Julie, riding a motorcycle around rural England. At a transport cafe, due to parallel bikes and leathers as seen from the back, she gets on the pillion of the wrong motorcycle (that of Tom Bennett), and her counterpart Irene gets on Larry's bike. Both girls realise their mistake ten minutes later.

Both couples return to the cafe to resolve it. Tom is ridiculed at the counter. Larry returns but speeds off when he sees a police car. One couple go to Sevenhills and one to Westport.

Tom heads to his Aunt Phoebe, who runs a college for young ladies in Sevenhills. Aunt Phoebe is immediately confused and thinks a love triangle is on the cards, but she treats Tom and Julie with great kindness.

Larry takes Irene to a hotel, but they are suspicious and refuse to give him a room. Eventually Ted, a barman, gives them a tip of a hotel which will take them. The night porter is surprised when they ask for two rooms rather than one.

Julie appears in Tom's bedroom in her pyjamas and they chat. He is very shy but she kisses him.

Larry heads to the docks to organise an illicit passage out of the country but his cash is in Sevenhills. He goes back to Irene's hotel room and tells her the whole story. She is sleeping nude but is very prim and polite. The next day she buys a new dress and heads to locate Sevenhills Ladies College and Aunt Phoebe. Meanwhile Julie goes clothes shopping, using some of Larry's money that he had left with her. Back at the college she treats Tom to a view of her in a basque. Larry appears at the door and a fight between the men ensues.

Irene tells Larry that she loves him. She materialises at the US Army HQ as Larry gives himself up. She claims to be pregnant by Larry (untrue) in order to lessen his court martial sentence.

We jump to both girls pushing prams.

Cast
 George Chakiris as Larry Currado
 Janette Scott as Irene
 Alfred Lynch as Thomas 'Tom' Ernest Bennett
 Jocelyn Lane as Julie Matthews
 Athene Seyler as Aunt Phoebe Tonks
 Bernard Braden as Sergeant Sokolow  
 Malcolm Keen as Harry Stoneham  
 Ambrosine Phillpotts as Lady Smith-Adams  
 Jack MacGowran as Night Porter  
 Robert Ayres as Colonel Robert Thompson  
 Edward Evans as Mack  
 Harry Locke as Ted  
 Jeremy Lloyd as Bowler-hatted young man  
 Marianne Stone as Grand Hotel day receptionist

Production
It was based on an idea of a producer after he saw two people out riding.

Reception
The film received poor reviews and recorded a loss of £53,000.

References

External links

1962 films
Films directed by Freddie Francis
British romantic comedy films
British black-and-white films
1962 romantic comedy films
1962 directorial debut films
Motorcycling films
1960s English-language films
1960s British films